This is an incomplete list of Bien de Interés Cultural landmarks in the Province of Ourense, Spain.

 As Burgas
 Monastery of San Salvador de Celanova
 Monastery of Santa María de Oseira
 Ourense Cathedral
 Ponte Vella
 Ribadavia

References 

Ourense